The Fellowship and Star is a Grade II listed pub at Randlesdown Road, Bellingham, London SE6 3BT.

Built in 1923–24 and designed by the architect F. G. Newnham, the pub opened as The Fellowship Inn. Under that name, it hosted gigs by bands including Fleetwood Mac and John Mayall & the Bluesbreakers, and was used as both a gym and a home by boxer Henry Cooper in the run-up to his 1963 fight against Muhammad Ali.

In 2018 The Fellowship Inn underwent refurbishment and redevelopment to restore the interior. It reopened in June 2019 as The Fellowship and Star, including a cinema, café, music rooms and community spaces. It subsequently closed as a victim of COVID-19 in 2020 and re-opened on 21st September 2022 once again named The Fellowship Inn.

The pub is on Campaign for Real Ale's National Inventory of Historic Pub Interiors.

References

Pubs in the London Borough of Lewisham
National Inventory Pubs
Grade II listed buildings in the London Borough of Lewisham
Grade II listed pubs in London